Falls Airport may refer to:
Falls International Airport (IATA: INL) near International Falls, Minnesota
Fergus Falls Municipal Airport (IATA: FFM) near Fergus Falls, Minnesota